Monique LaRue (born April 3, 1948) is a Quebec writer.

Biography
The daughter of Therese Cloutier and Jean-Paul LaRue, she was born in Longueuil and was educated in Montreal at the Collège Jésus-Marie, the Collège Marie-de-France and the Université de Montréal, and at the École des hautes études in Paris. She has taught literature and French at the Cégep Édouard-Montpetit for more than 30 years. LaRue is a member of the Académie des lettres du Québec. She has sat on juries for various literary prizes, including the Prix Émile-Nelligan, the Prix Athanase-David, the Governor General's Literary Awards and the Grand prix littéraire de la ville de Montréal (serving as chair for three years).

LaRue published her first novel La Cohorte fictive in 1979. She has written literary commentary for Spirale and other publications.

Selected works 
 Les Faux fuyants, novel (1982)
 Plages, stories (1986)
 L'Aventure, la mésaventure, stories (1987)
 Promenades littéraires dans Montréal (1989) with Jean-François Chassay
 Copies conformes, novel (1990), received the Grand prix du livre de Montréal
 La démarche du crabe, novel (1996), received the Prix du Journal de Montréal
 La gloire de Cassiodore, novel (2002), received the Governor General's Award for French-language fiction
 De fil en aiguille, collected essays (2006)
 L'œil de Marquise, novel (2009), received the Prix Jacques-Cartier du roman de langue française

References 

1948 births
Living people
Canadian novelists in French
Canadian short story writers in French
Canadian women novelists
Canadian women short story writers
20th-century Canadian novelists
20th-century Canadian women writers
21st-century Canadian novelists
21st-century Canadian women writers
People from Longueuil
Writers from Quebec
Université de Montréal alumni
École pratique des hautes études alumni
Governor General's Award-winning fiction writers
20th-century Canadian short story writers
21st-century Canadian short story writers